Vegdi River is a river in western India in Gujarat whose origin is Near Bhervi village. Its basin has a maximum length of 26 km. The total catchment area of the basin is 119 km2.

References

Rivers of Gujarat
Rivers of India